The 2006–07 WRU Division One West or 2006–07 Asda Division One West for sponsorship reasons was the sixteenth WRU Division One West and the first season of the WRU Division One West. The season began on Saturday 2 September 2006 and ended on Saturday 28 April 2007. Twelve teams played each other on a home and away basis. This was also the last season where teams earned three points for a win and one point for a draw.

Table

Results

Matchday 1

Matchday 2

Matchday 3

Matchday 4 (5/6)

Matchday 5

Matchday 6

Matchday 7

Matchday 8

Matchday 9

Matchday 10

Matchday 11

Matchday 12 (5/6)

Matchday 13 (1/6)

Matchday 14 (3/6)

Matchday 15

Matchday 16

Matchday 17 (5/6)

Matchday 18

Matchday 19 (5/6)

Matchday 4 (6/6)

Mixed matchdays

Matchday 20

Matchday 21

Matchday 22

Mixed matchdays

Matchday 13 (4/6)

Mixed matchdays

Matchday 13 (6/6)

Division One West
Wales Cup1